Awarua Point is located on the southwestern coast of New Zealand's South Island, at the northern end of Big Bay,  north of Milford Sound, and  north of the mouth of the Hollyford River.

Traditionally, Awarua Point is regarded as the end of Fiordland and the start of the West Coast region, although the boundary of Fiordland National Park is located  farther south at the northern end of Martins Bay.

The New Zealand Ministry for Culture and Heritage gives a translation of "two streams" for Awarua.

See also  
 Awarua Plains

References

Headlands of the West Coast, New Zealand
Westland District